The Combin de Valsorey is the second highest summit in the Grand Combin massif.

References

Alpine four-thousanders
Mountains of the Alps
Mountains of Valais
Pennine Alps
Mountains of Switzerland
Four-thousanders of Switzerland